John Eekelaar FBA (born 2 July 1942) is a South African former academic specialising in family law. In 2005 he retired from teaching after a forty-year career at Oxford University. He was the academic director of Pembroke College from 2005 to 2009 and is currently the co-director of the Oxford Centre for Family Law and Policy (OXFLAP).

Biography
Eekelaar was born in Johannesburg, South Africa, and earned his LL.B. from King's College London in 1963, and gained his BCL and MA from University College, Oxford in 1965 and 1967 respectively.

Eekelaar held a Rhodes Scholarship from 1963 to 1965, and was awarded the Vinerian Scholarship in 1965. He was called to the Bar in 1968 at the Inner Temple. Eekelaar has been a Tutorial Fellow at Pembroke College since 1965; he held a CUF Lecturership from 1966 to 1991, and has been Reader in Law since 1991. He was elected to a Fellowship of the British Academy in July 2001.

Eekelaar has been editor of the International Journal of Law, Policy and the Family and the Oxford Journal of Legal Studies.

Bibliography

Books

Journals

Book chapters

See also

Child custody
Divorce
Family law
Parental rights
Paternity (law)
Residence (ENG)
Professor Carol Smart
Mavis Maclean

References

External links
Profile, Oxford Law, University of Oxford.

Family law in the United Kingdom
1942 births
Living people
Alumni of King's College London
Alumni of University College, Oxford
White South African people
South African people of Dutch descent
South African Rhodes Scholars
Fellows of Pembroke College, Oxford
Fellows of the British Academy
Members of the Inner Temple
Academic journal editors
Sociologists of law
Legal scholars of the University of Oxford
Fellows of King's College London